Michael Robert Conway (born 19 August 1983) is a British professional racing driver. He lives in Sevenoaks, Kent and is currently competing in the FIA World Endurance Championship with Toyota Gazoo Racing.

Biography
Conway who was born in Bromley, London, attended Sevenoaks Prep School from 1986 to 1996.

Karting to F3
Like many racing drivers, he started karting at the age of eight at Rye House in Hertfordshire. After that, he went on to be the Formula A British Karting Champion, then raced in Formula Ford with Van Diemen. He was the Formula Renault UK Champion in 2004 and then entered the British F3 International Series in 2005, with the same Fortec Motorsport team with which he had competed in Formula Renault UK.

In British F3, he was the highest placed rookie and finished 3rd behind Alvaro Parente and Charlie Kimball, as well as managing 13th in the BP Ultimate Masters at Zandvoort, having started 16th, while at the Macau Grand Prix, Conway ended up fourth in both the qualifying and the qualifying race around the Circuito da Guia, before a problematic Grand Prix saw him retire with engine failure, but classified 14th.

Following that success he was signed by 2MB Sports Management run by former Grand Prix drivers Martin Brundle and Mark Blundell, and signed for the Räikkönen Robertson Racing team, owned by then McLaren driver Kimi Räikkönen and his race-manager Steve Robertson. In the 2006 season, Mike dominated the British F3 International Series, and clinched the title with three races remaining, as well as finishing first of the British F3 drivers in Race Two of the prestigious Pau Grand Prix, in France, a round of the British F3 International Series for 2006 - Romain Grosjean won the race. While at the Macau Grand Prix, after qualifying 11th, he finished 7th in the qualifying race, before becoming the first British driver to win the Grand Prix since Darren Manning in 1999.

GP2

He also made his GP2 debut at Silverstone in June 2006, when he replaced the injured Olivier Pla in a DPR Direxiv car. Having stalled at the start of Race One, he battled home to 11th place. In Race 2 he finished 11th again.

Conway also won the National Racing Driver of the Year Award at the 2006 McLaren Autosport Awards.

He then signed up to drive a full season for Super Nova Racing in the 2007 GP2 Series, taking a podium finish at Silverstone, and also signed as a test driver with the Honda Racing F1 Team . He remained in the series for 2008, having signed for the Trident Racing team, after testing for several other teams . At Monaco he took his first GP2 series win (and first 2008 podium) in the sprint race, earning pole position by finishing 8th in the feature race (in which he ran third before being hit by backmarker Javier Villa on the final lap). At Magny-Cours he also finished 8th in the feature race, but this time he faded to finish 6th in a wet sprint race.  He eventually finished 12th in the drivers' championship, an improvement of two positions on the previous year.

IndyCar

During 2008, Conway was given an opportunity to test an IndyCar Series car at Infineon Raceway and surprised several series regulars by being top of the times during one session. Conway signed with Dreyer & Reinbold Racing to compete in the IndyCar Series full-time in 2009.

On the final lap of the 2010 Indianapolis 500, Conway was battling side by side with Ryan Hunter-Reay when the two cars became entangled as Hunter-Reay's Dallara ran low on fuel and stuttered between turns 3 and 4, resulting in Conway's Dallara-Honda being launched into the air. Conway suffered a broken leg during the crash and was flown straight to the Methodist Hospital of Indianapolis. Conway also received a compression fracture of one of his thoracic vertebrae and has been fitted with back brace. The injuries effectively ended his participation in the rest of the 2010 Izod IndyCar Series season.

On 1 February 2011, Andretti Autosport announced that Conway had been signed to a full-time ride for the 2011 IndyCar season. He won his first IndyCar race at Long Beach on 17 April 2011, but the remainder of the year was disappointing, as Conway only managed to score three more top-10 finishes and failed to qualify for the Indianapolis 500; he finished 17th in the championship.

Conway moved to the A. J. Foyt Enterprises team for the 2012 season. He also made his racing return to the Indianapolis 500, having failed to qualify the year before. He qualified near the back but appeared to have a strong car coming up several positions during the race. On lap 79 Conway entered the pits during a scheduled green flag pit stop period. He made contact with one of his crew members damaging his front wing but not injuring the crew member. The damage went unnoticed by the crew who hurried up the pit stop to keep Conway in contention. A few laps later Conway lost control of his car spinning in front of Will Power and making contact with Power causing him to hit the inside wall. At the same time Conway's car turned around backwards and flew airborne into the fence topside first. Conway was uninjured in the incident, but due to damage he was unable to finish the race and was scored in 29th position. He later finished in third place in Toronto, his best result of the season.

In the week leading up to the final race of the 2012 season—held at the Fontana superspeedway—Conway informed the Foyt team that he no longer felt comfortable competing on oval tracks, and asked not to race. He was replaced by Wade Cunningham. Conway's decision stemmed from injuries after a crash at the 2010 Indianapolis 500 and the debate over IndyCar competing on oval tracks after the October 2011 death of Dan Wheldon.

In 2013, Conway ran a one race deal with Rahal-Letterman-Lanigan Racing at Long Beach finishing 25th with an electrical issue, then signed with Dale Coyne Racing for the doubleheader events of the year, winning his first race out at the Belle Isle Park Course. In 2014 he ran only the road courses and street circuits for Ed Carpenter Racing winning both the Toyota Grand Prix of Long Beach as well as the Honda Indy Toronto Doubleheader.

Sports car racing

In 2013, Conway decided to enter sports car racing to supplement his Indycar career. He became a full-time driver for G-Drive Racing in the FIA World Endurance Championship. Conway and co-drivers John Martin and Roman Rusinov were excluded from a 3rd-place finish at Le Mans in LMP2 but took four class wins in the season to finish 3rd in the LMP2 Drivers trophy.

In 2014, in addition to Indycar Conway joined Toyota Racing as a test and reserve driver in the FIA World Endurance Championship. He raced in Austin, Bahrain and São Paulo, collecting a race win.

The Brit soon became a full-time driver at Toyota for the 2015 season, racing with Stéphane Sarrazin and Alexander Wurz.

Formula E
In July 2014 it was announced that Conway would race in Formula E with the Dragon Racing Team. However, on 5 September, Conway announced he had left the team.

Racing record

Career summary

† – As Conway was a guest driver, he was ineligible to score points.
* Season still in progress.

Complete GP2 Series results
(key) (Races in bold indicate pole position) (Races in italics indicate fastest lap)

Complete IndyCar Series results
(key) (Races in bold indicate pole position. Races in italics indicate fastest lap)

 1 The Las Vegas Indy 300 was abandoned after Dan Wheldon died from injuries sustained in a 15-car crash on lap 11.

Indianapolis 500

Complete V8 Supercar results

† Not Eligible for points

Complete FIA World Endurance Championship results

Complete 24 Hours of Le Mans results

Complete Formula E results
(key) (Races in bold indicate pole position; races in italics indicate fastest lap)

Complete European Le Mans Series results

Complete IMSA SportsCar Championship results

* Season still in progress.

Complete 24 Hours of Daytona results

References

External links

1983 births
Living people
People from Sevenoaks
English racing drivers
British Formula Renault 2.0 drivers
British Formula Three Championship drivers
Formula Renault Eurocup drivers
Formula Ford drivers
GP2 Series drivers
Indianapolis 500 drivers
IndyCar Series drivers
North American Formula Renault drivers
Supercars Championship drivers
FIA World Endurance Championship drivers
24 Hours of Le Mans drivers
24 Hours of Le Mans winning drivers
International GT Open drivers
American Le Mans Series drivers
Formula E drivers
24 Hours of Daytona drivers
Fortec Motorsport drivers
Double R Racing drivers
David Price Racing drivers
Super Nova Racing drivers
Trident Racing drivers
Dreyer & Reinbold Racing drivers
Andretti Autosport drivers
A. J. Foyt Enterprises drivers
Rahal Letterman Lanigan Racing drivers
Dale Coyne Racing drivers
G-Drive Racing drivers
Ed Carpenter Racing drivers
Toyota Gazoo Racing drivers
Venturi Grand Prix drivers
Action Express Racing drivers
European Le Mans Series drivers
Dragon Racing drivers
TDS Racing drivers
Comtec Racing drivers
Level 5 Motorsports drivers
Alan Docking Racing drivers
Manor Motorsport drivers
WeatherTech SportsCar Championship drivers